Karsten Müller (born November 23, 1970, in Hamburg, West Germany) is a German chess Grandmaster and author. He earned the Grandmaster title in 1998 and a PhD in mathematics in 2002 at the University of Hamburg. He had placed third in the 1996 German championship and second in the 1997 German championship.

He has written about endgames, including in Fundamental Chess Endings (Gambit Publications, 2001) and Secrets of Pawn Endings (Everyman Chess, 2000), both with Frank Lamprecht. He also wrote How to Play Chess Endgames, with Wolfgang Pajeken (Gambit, 2008) and Magic of Chess Tactics (Russell Enterprises 2003) with FIDE Master Claus Dieter Meyer.  His column "Endgame Corner" has appeared at ChessCafe.com since January 2001 and he has been a regular contributor to ChessBase Magazine since 1997. He also contributed material to some of the early issues of the online daily chess newspaper Chess Today.

The seventh chapter of Tibor Karolyi's 2009 book Genius in the Background is devoted to him. His main interest apart from chess are football and mathematical games.

Books
  Corrected edition by Gambit in 2007, .

ChessBase Products
Karsten has authored a large number of ChessBase products. These can be found online here

Notes

Further reading

External links
 

1970 births
Living people
Chess grandmasters
German chess players
German chess writers
German male non-fiction writers
University of Hamburg alumni